Élodie Ginette Thomis (born 13 August 1986) is a French former football player who played for French club Olympique Lyon of the Division 1 Féminine. She played either a winger or striker and was described as a player who possesses pace comparable to that of French men's internationals Thierry Henry and Sidney Govou. Thomis is a graduate of the women's section of the Clairefontaine academy and was a French women's international having made her debut with the team in June 2005 at UEFA Women's Euro 2005 against Italy.

Career

Early career
Thomis was born in the commune of Colombes, a northwestern suburb of Paris, to parents of Martiniquais heritage. She began her sporting career training as a sprinter and long-distance runner. At the age of 13, Thomis began playing football after attending a trial for women footballers in Épinay-sur-Seine. After successfully playing for the local club, she joined Football Club Feminin de Colombes in her hometown. In 2002, Thomis was selected to attend CNFE Clairefontaine, the women's section of the Clairefontaine academy. She spent three years training at the facility alongside future domestic teammates Louisa Necib, as well as future international teammates Caroline Pizzala, Élise Bussaglia, and Laure Lepailleur. In three seasons at the academy, Thomis played in over 50 matches scoring 32 goals.

Montpellier and Lyon
After departing Clairefontaine, Thomis joined Division 1 Féminine club Montpellier. Necib later joined the club the following year. In her first season with the club, Thomis appeared in 20 league matches scoring three goals as Montpellier finished runner-up in the league to Juvisy. She also made her European debut participating in the 2005–06 UEFA Women's Cup. In the team's first leg quarter-final tie against Danish outfit Brøndby IF, Thomis scored a double, which, after a positive result in the second leg, allowed Montpellier to advanced to the semi-finals where the club was eliminated by the eventual champions 1. FFC Frankfurt. Thomis' goal output increased in the 2005–06 season scoring 15 goals in 22 matches as Montpellier claimed the Challenge de France, the women's domestic cup in France. After the season, in June 2007, rival D1 Féminine Lyon confirmed that both Thomis and Necib would be joining the club for the 2007–08 season. In her debut season at Lyon, she played in 17 league matches scoring seven goals helping the club win the league and cup double. In the 2008–09 season, Thomis appeared in 17 total matches scoring 14 goals as Lyon won the league for the third consecutive season and reached the semi-finals for the second straight season in the UEFA Women's Cup.

In the ensuing two seasons, due to injuries, Thomis was limited to only 30 appearances domestically. The striker did scored 17 goals in that span. In the re-branded UEFA Women's Champions League, Thomis made eight appearances scoring three goals as Lyon reached the final in the 2009–10 edition of the competition. Lyon was defeated by German club Turbine Potsdam in the penultimate match. In the 2010–11 edition of the Champions League, Thomis was a part of the team that won the competition defeating its nemesis Turbine Potsdam 2–0 in the final.

She left Lyon after the 2017/18 season.

International career
Thomis made her international debut for les Bleues on 6 June 2005 in a match against Italy. Competing for France in 2011 FIFA Women's World Cup and 2012 London Olympics Thomis helped the team reach the semi-finals in all three competitions. In 2015 FIFA Women's World Cup, Thomis helped France reach the quarter-finals where the team was eliminated by Germany on penalty shootout. Thomis has scored a total of 5 goals at these Olympics and World Cup finals.

Career statistics

Club
Statistics accurate as of 14 November 2012

International

(Correct as of 19 September 2012)

International goals

Honours

Club
Montpellier
Coupe de France Féminine: Winner 2006, 2007

Lyon
Division 1 Féminine: Winner 2007–08, 2008–09, 2009–10, 2010–11, 2011–12, 2012–13, 2013–14, 2014–15, 2015–16
Coupe de France Féminine: Winner 2007–08, 2011–12, 2013, 2014, 2015, 2016
UEFA Women's Champions League: Winner 2010–11, 2011–12, 2015–16, 2016–17 2017–18

International
France
UEFA Women's Under-19 Championship: 2003
Cyprus Cup: Winner 2012, 2014
SheBelieves Cup: Winner 2017

See also
 List of women's footballers with 100 or more international caps

References

External links

 Club profile 
 
 
  
 
 

1986 births
Sportspeople from Colombes
Living people
French women's footballers
French people of Martiniquais descent
France women's international footballers
Montpellier HSC (women) players
Olympique Lyonnais Féminin players
CNFE Clairefontaine players
2011 FIFA Women's World Cup players
2015 FIFA Women's World Cup players
Footballers at the 2012 Summer Olympics
Footballers at the 2016 Summer Olympics
Olympic footballers of France
FIFA Century Club
Women's association football wingers
Women's association football forwards
Division 1 Féminine players
Black French sportspeople
Footballers from Hauts-de-Seine
UEFA Women's Euro 2017 players